Mobile Fidelity Sound Lab (MFSL or MoFi) is a record label that specialized in the production of audiophile issues. The company produces reissued vinyl LP records, compact discs, and Super Audio CDs and other formats.

History 
Recording engineer Brad Miller (1939–1998) released the first recordings on the Mobile Fidelity label in March 1958, a recording of a Southern Pacific steam locomotive. Later LPs included other steam trains, environmental sounds and orchestral music, and a few pop and orchestral recordings. In 1977 Mobile Fidelity Sound Labs was founded and began releasing Original Master Recording LPs, using a half-speed mastering process.

In November 1999, Mobile Fidelity Sound Lab shut down after the bankruptcy of M. S. Distributing. In 2001 MFSL's assets were acquired by Jim Davis of Music Direct.

Products

LPs 

In 1977, Mobile Fidelity began to produce a line of records known as "Original Master Recording" vinyl LPs. These albums were previously released by other companies, licensed by Mobile Fidelity, and remastered using half-speed mastering from the original analog master tapes, without compression, and with minimal equalization. The recordings were pressed in Japan using a plastic compound, invented by JVC, and marketed as "Supervinyl" by Mobile Fidelity.

In 2016, Mobile Fidelity Sound Lab launched a new vinyl series called Ultradisc One-Step, releasing titles including Santana's Abraxas and Bill Evans's Sunday at the Village Vanguard.

Cassettes, CDs, and SACDs 

During the mid-1980s, Mobile Fidelity began to sell CDs and cassettes. In the 2000s, it began to sell SACDs.

MoFi Electronics 
In 2016 an audio electronics line was introduced under the MoFi banner. MoFi Electronics offices and turntable manufacturing are based in Ann Arbor, Michigan.

Audio sourcing controversy 
On July 14, 2022, Michael Esposito, a record store owner and YouTuber, released a video on his YouTube channel "The 'In' Groove" stating that "pretty reliable sources" informed him that, contrary to the company's official statements and marketing, MFSL had been using digital masters instead of analogue for years. John Wood, the label's executive president, saw Esposito's video and then invited him to California for a tour of their business. A second video was produced with Esposito interviewing MFSL staff, where they confirmed that they were using Direct Stream Digital files when creating their vinyl masters for duplication. The staff members stated that at least 60% of all titles used this process by the end of 2011, and that the process was also being used for the label's Ultradisc One-Step releases, which were previously marketed as coming directly from the original master tapes. The revelation generated controversy over not only Mobile Fidelity's integrity, given the company's marketing and the stigmatization of digital audio in audiophile circles, but also the extent of analog audio's perceived merits over digital audio. The scandal became known as "MoFi Gate" (combining an abbreviation of "Mobile Fidelity" with the "-gate" suffix derived from the Watergate scandal) in audiophile communities. In August 2022, Adam Stiles, a longtime customer of Mobile Fidelity Sound Lab, filed a class action fraud lawsuit against the label over the revelations.

References

External links 
 

American record labels
Audiophile record labels
Reissue record labels
Jazz record labels
1977 establishments in Illinois
American companies established in 1977